Vickers is a famous name in British engineering that existed through many companies starting in 1826.

Vickers may also refer to:

People
 Vickers (surname)
 Baroness Vickers, a life peerage awarded to Joan Vickers, Baroness Vickers (1907–1994)

Companies

 Vickers Aircraft Company, a New Zealand aircraft manufacturer unrelated to the British conglomerate
 Vickers Limited (1828–1927), a British engineering conglomerate
 Canadian Vickers (1911–1944), a Canadian subsidiary of Vickers Limited
 Vickers-Armstrongs (1927–1977), engineering conglomerate arising from the merger of Vickers Limited with Sir W G Armstrong Whitworth & Company
 Vickers plc (1977–1999), including Vickers Defence Systems, the defence arm of Vickers plc, sold by Rolls-Royce plc to Alvis plc in 2002
 Vickers Shipbuilding and Engineering (1871-2007), the former shipbuilding and armaments division of Vickers Armstrongs
 Vickers Petroleum (1918–1980), an American petroleum company unrelated to the British conglomerate

Places
 Vickers Nunatak, Ross Dependency, Antarctica, a massive nunatak (glacial island)
 Vickers, a community in the township of West Grey, Ontario, Canada

Other uses
 Vickers Aircraft Wave, a two seated amphibious aircraft
 Vickers hardness test, popular method for measuring the hardness of materials
 Vickers machine gun, produced by Vickers Limited

See also
 Vicker (disambiguation)
 Vicar (disambiguation)